The Massena Terminal Railroad  is a Class III terminal railroad operating in the U.S. state of New York. It was built in the early 20th century, beginning operations in 1900. In 2005, the railroad was purchased by holding company RailAmerica. Shortline holding company Genesee & Wyoming acquired the Massena Terminal Railroad in 2012 as part of its purchase of RailAmerica. The railroad's traffic comes mainly from aluminum and petroleum products. The MTR hauled around 4,300 carloads in 2008.

History 

The Massena Terminal Railroad was incorporated in May 1900, to connect a power plant of the St. Lawrence Power Company to the Rome, Watertown and Ogdensburg Railroad and Grand Trunk Railway at Massena. The New York Central Railroad took over rail operations for the MTR in 1915, with the latter remaining owner of the physical infratstructure.

Significant traffic was carried by the Massena Terminal Railroad during the construction of the St. Lawrence Seaway; new tracks were laid to support the project, and then removed upon its completion. When the company had its bridge across the Grasse River replaced in 1946, it included an Alcoa-designed all-aluminum bridge span that was reportedly the first in the world.

The New York Central Railroad acquired the MTR in 1966 from Alcoa, which cited "improved operating efficiencies" as the reason for the sale. Shortline holding company RailAmerica purchased the MTR in 2005, eventually assigning it to the company's Northeast Region in 2008. RailAmerica was itself purchased by fellow shortline holding company Genesee & Wyoming in 2012, which became the Massena Terminal Railroad's owner. The railroad received a $1.6 million grant from the New York State Department of Transportation in 2013 for infrastructure improvements.

Operations 
The company's primary customer is an Alcoa facility in Massena. The MTR connects this facility with a CSX Transportation line also in Massena. In 2008, the company reported approximately 4,300 carloads.

References

External links

Official site

New York (state) railroads
Switching and terminal railroads
Railway companies established in 1900
RailAmerica